Players and pairs who neither have high enough rankings nor receive wild cards may participate in a qualifying tournament held one week before the annual Wimbledon Tennis Championships.

Seeds

  Bruce Manson (qualified)
  Michiel Schapers (qualifying competition, lucky loser)
  Claudio Mezzadri (qualifying competition, lucky loser)
  David Mustard (second round)
  Todd Nelson (first round)
  Tom Cain (qualified)
  Peter Doohan (second round)
  Shahar Perkiss (qualifying competition, lucky loser)
  Andy Andrews (second round)
  Carlos Kirmayr (qualified)
  Eddie Edwards (qualified)
  Mike De Palmer (qualifying competition)
  David Dowlen (qualifying competition)
  Butch Walts (second round)
  Drew Gitlin (second round)
  Eric Jelen (first round)
  Jeff Borowiak (first round)
  Jaromir Becka (second round)
  Boris Becker (qualified)
  Richard Meyer (first round)
  Randy Nixon (second round)
  John Mattke (second round)
  Broderick Dyke (second round)
  Craig A. Miller (qualified)
  Kim Warwick (qualifying competition)
  Russell Simpson (qualified)
  Chris Johnstone (qualifying competition)
  Brian Levine (first round)
  Jonathan Canter (first round)
  Paul Annacone (qualified)
  Ken Flach (qualified)
  Charles Strode (first round)

Qualifiers

  Bruce Manson
  Craig Wittus
  Sherwood Stewart
  Boris Becker
  Russell Simpson
  Tom Cain
  Ken Flach
  Guy Forget
  Craig A. Miller
  Carlos Kirmayr
  Eddie Edwards
  Bud Cox
  Paul Annacone
  Christo van Rensburg
  Jeff Turpin
  Mark Kratzmann

Lucky losers

  Michiel Schapers
  Claudio Mezzadri
  Shahar Perkiss

Qualifying draw

First qualifier

Second qualifier

Third qualifier

Fourth qualifier

Fifth qualifier

Sixth qualifier

Seventh qualifier

Eighth qualifier

Ninth qualifier

Tenth qualifier

Eleventh qualifier

Twelfth qualifier

Thirteenth qualifier

Fourteenth qualifier

Fifteenth qualifier

Sixteenth qualifier

External links

 1984 Wimbledon Championships – Men's draws and results at the International Tennis Federation

Men's Singles Qualifying
Wimbledon Championship by year – Men's singles qualifying